MARF may refer to:

 Mesothelioma Applied Research Foundation
 Messaging Abuse Reporting Format WG, a working group of the Internet Engineering Task Force to standardize Abuse Reporting Format
 Modifications and Additions to a Reactor Facility, where the S7G reactor was tested
 Modular Audio Recognition Framework
 Multiple Arbitrary Function Generator in Buchla
 Marf, a recurring character in Robot and Monster
 Martha Richler, (born 1964), an art historian and cartoonist whose pen name is Marf